Camille is a 1915 American silent film based on the story La Dame aux Camélias (The Lady of the Camellias) by Alexandre Dumas, fils, first published in French as a novel in 1848 and as a play in 1852. Adapted for the screen by Frances Marion, Camille was directed by Albert Capellani and starred Clara Kimball Young as Marguerite Gautier and Paul Capellani as her lover, Armand.

Plot

Cast

 Clara Kimball Young as Marguerite Gautier 
 Paul Capellani as Armand Duval
 Lillian Cook as Cecile
 Robert W. Cummings as Monsieur Duval
 Dan Baker as Joseph
 Stanhope Wheatcroft as Robert Bousac
 Frederick Truesdell as the Count de Varville
 William Jefferson as Gaston
 Edward Kimballas The doctor
 Louise Ducey as Madame Prudence
 Beryl Morhange as Nanine

References

External links 

 
 
 
 

1915 films
American black-and-white films
1915 drama films
American films based on plays
American silent feature films
Films directed by Albert Capellani
Films based on Camille
Films based on adaptations
Silent American drama films
World Film Company films
Films with screenplays by Frances Marion
1910s American films